Boruj Rah (also Romanized as Borūj Rāh; also known as Bojrā and Borj Rāh) is a village in Shanderman Rural District, Shanderman District, Masal County, Gilan Province, Iran. At the 2006 census, its population was 24, in 5 families.

References 

Populated places in Masal County